The Henry Cort Community College, formerly Fareham Park Senior School, is a mixed sex comprehensive school in Fareham, Hampshire, England.

It is one of three comprehensive schools in Fareham, and had around 850 students at the last count. It has a rich sporting tradition, especially in field hockey, and has adequate sports facilities, including an astroturf pitch and a gym. The school is named after the iron pioneer, Henry Cort.

Environment
The college is set within a suburban  site, on the edge of Fareham Park Estate of Fareham, with views over the Meon Valley and The Solent, on a clear day, you can see the Isle of Wight.

Facilities
On 1 September 1984, as a result of the reorganisation of Fareham's Secondary Schools, Fareham Park School became Henry Cort Secondary School and later Henry Cort Community College. Henry Cort was derived from the name of a man who was arguably the most distinguished person to be associated with Fareham's Industrial past. He was essentially a simple man whose visionary genius was exploited by others more cynical and worldly wise than himself.

The college has eleven fully networked ICT suites with over 400 computers linked to the internet; seminar rooms; a specialist Design Technology room, including an electronics Lab; a Food Technology kitchen; art and design rooms, including textiles; two sports halls; specialist language rooms; science laboratories, a learning resource centre; an all-weather pitch; and sizeable sports fields.

Houses
The houses at Henry Cort are all named after English naval ships or submarines, this takes into the account the naval activity of nearby Portsmouth. Each of which has a colour to symbolise each. The houses names were decided on after a student vote.
The 4 Houses are named:

 Invincible (Green) - led by Mrs Nutt
 Victorious (Purple) - led by Mr Fearon 
 Daring (Red) - led by Mrs Warner
 Triumph (Yellow) - led by Miss Luff

Special Educational Needs
The college offers a special education department, located in the Communications Block formally the William Makepeace Thackeray Building.

Buildings
The college is split into five main buildings: the Prices Building, the Jenner Building, the Austen Building, the White Building, and the Thackeray Building, following a trend of naming the buildings for various English historical figures. The Thackeray Building is the main structure, with three floors housing the canteen, the English department and the languages department. The Austen Building houses the DT (Design Technology) classrooms, Student office and the nurse. While the Jenner Building is home to the sports hall, the gym, and the music and drama classroom, as well as the main seminar room. The White Building contains the science, Humanities and maths rooms, including science labs. The Prices Building houses the library and the principal’s office.

Sports Day
The college hosts an annual sports day, with events including javelin throw, sprints, and long, high and triple jump.

References

External links
 School website
 EduBase

Fareham
Secondary schools in Hampshire
Community schools in Hampshire